The 1989–90 Syracuse Orangemen basketball team represented Syracuse University in the 1989–90 NCAA Division I men's basketball season.  The Head coach was Jim Boeheim, serving for his 14th year.  The team played home games at the Carrier Dome in Syracuse, New York.  The team finished with a 26–7 (12–4) record, was Big East regular season champions, and advanced to the Southeast Regional semifinal of the NCAA tournament.

The team was led by Big East Player of the Year Derrick Coleman and sophomore Billy Owens.

Roster

Schedule and results

|-
!colspan=8| Big East tournament

|-
!colspan=8| NCAA tournament

Rankings

Awards and honors
Derrick Coleman – Big East Player of the Year

1990 NBA draft

References

Syracuse Orange
Syracuse Orange men's basketball seasons
Syracuse
Syracuse Orange
Syracuse Orange